The 2013–14 National League A season is the seventh ice hockey season of Switzerland's top hockey league, the National League A. Overall, it is the 76th season of Swiss professional hockey. It was won by ZSC Lions after beating Kloten Flyers 4-0 in the playoff final.

Regular season

Teams
After the 2012–13 season, SCL Tigers were defeated by Lausanne HC of National League B, switching places with them. The number of teams stands at 12.

Regular season

Playoffs

Relegation round
Six games were played as part of the relegation round. Results from the regular season carried over.

Final
The bottom two teams played in the final.

EHC Biel - Rapperswil-Jona Lakers 2:4 (3:2 OT, 1:3, 2:3, 4:3 OT, 1:4, 4:5)

Playouts
The bottom team from the relegation round, EHC Biel, played against HC Viège, the National League B champion, for the right to play in the 2014-15 NLA season.

EHC Biel - EHC Visp 4:1 (5:2, 2:5, 5:1, 4:1, 3:2)

External links
Official League Website  
Official League Website  

1
Swiss
National League (ice hockey) seasons